Andrés Manuel López Obrador, or AMLO, is the 65th president of Mexico.

AMLO may also refer to:
 Anti-Money Laundering Office (Thailand)
 Anti-Money Laundering Office, Executive Yuan, Taiwan
 Annual Missile Launch Operation, at Wheelus Air Base in the 1950s
 Air Mobility Liaison Officer of the United States Air Force

See also 
 Amloh, a town in India
 Low-power broadcasting